Apollonius of Aphrodisias in Cilicia is described in the Suda as a high priest and a historian. He is said to have written a work on the town of Tralles, a second on the mythological figure Orpheus and his mysteries, and a third on the history of Caria (Καρικά), of which the eighteenth book is mentioned, and which is often referred to by Stephanus of Byzantium.

Notes

Ancient Greek historians
Ancient Greek mythographers
Ancient Greek writers known only from secondary sources
Ancient Greek priests